Sunnmørsposten is a newspaper published by Polaris Media in Ålesund, Norway.

History and profile
In its early days, Sunnmørsposten competed with several other local newspapers, including Aalesunds Avis (1917–1957), Aalesunds blad (1871–1895), Aalesunds Handels- og Sjøfartstidende (1857–1904), Aalesunds Socialdemokrat (1908–1910), and Arbeidernes blad (1898).

Until May 2006 Sunnmørsposten was published in broadsheet format. At the time of its transition to compact format, it was one of the last newspapers in Norway to be published in broadsheet. Published in compact format (tabloid) six days a week, the paper consists of two sections; one for local news, sports and classified ads, and one for culture, weather, opinions and editorials and obituaries. On Saturdays they print a third weekend-section.

Mecom owned Sunnmorsposten until February 2009 when it was sold to the Polaris Media.

In 2012  Sunnmorsposten launched a project in datajournalism.

References

External links
 Sunnmørsposten - smp.no

1882 establishments in Norway
Mass media in Ålesund
Daily newspapers published in Norway
Norwegian-language newspapers
Polaris Media
Publications established in 1882